Heinz Thonhofer (born 25 September 1959) is an Austrian footballer. He played in one match for the Austria national football team in 1983.

References

External links
 

1959 births
Living people
Austrian footballers
Austria international footballers
Place of birth missing (living people)
Association footballers not categorized by position